Dragonfire is a spy thriller novel by author Andrew Kaplan, published by Warner Books in hardcover and softcover editions. A Main Selection of the Book of the Month Club in England, it was an international best-seller.

Plot summary 

Parker, an American CIA agent, is captured while on a mission in Bangkok. Sawyer, a lone CIA agent is sent on the same mission, code-named “Dragonfire”, to prevent another Southeast war. Sawyer tracks the missing Parker from the deadly underworld of Bangkok’s waterfront to the forbidden hill country of the Golden Triangle. He joins forces with Suong, a beautiful Eurasian resistance fighter and Toonsang, a treacherous opium trader, who leads them to the lair of Bhun Sa, the most powerful warlord in the opium trade. Sawyer kills Bhun Sa and he and Suong escape to abandoned temple ruins in Cambodia. To convince him she has not betrayed him, Suong tells of her survival of the Khmer Rouge's Killing Fields. Sawyer is captured by the Khmer Rouge. Suong is revealed as a war criminal, the sister of Pranh, the notorious Brother Number Two of the Killing Fields. Vietnamese forces attack the Khmer Rouge, freeing Sawyer who takes Suong captive. After a fight on the Bangkok waterfront, during which Sawyer kills Vasnasong, the billionaire businessman behind the plot, Sawyer turns Suong over to the Cambodian resistance. In an epilogue, the story of Suong’s brutal death on a ship at the hands of her former victims is revealed.

Release details 

 July 1987, Warner Books, hardcover, 
 April 1988, Warner Books, paperback, 
 1988, Arrow Books, paperback, 
 1987, Century Hutchinson, hardcover, 
 1990, Goldmann Verlag, paperback, 
 1988, Bell (Greek), paperback

References 

 Dragonfire, Warner Hardcover (https://www.amazon.com/gp/offer-listing/0446513776/ref=sr_1_olp_3/105-3701850-1064460?ie=UTF8&s=books&qid=1187998715&sr=8-3). Amazon.com. Retrieved on 2007-8-24.
 Dragonfire, Warner Paperback (https://www.amazon.com/gp/offer-listing/B000P0KE2E/ref=sr_1_olp_2/105-3701850-1064460?ie=UTF8&s=books&qid=1187998715&sr=8-2). Retrieved on 2007-8-24.

1987 American novels
American spy novels
American thriller novels
Novels set in Thailand
Warner Books books